Saulo Pereira de Carvalho (born 29 July 1971) commonly known as Saulo is a former Brazilian born footballer who played as a midfielder.

Football

Little is known about Saulo's career before he came to Poland in 1997 at the age 26 other than that be had played in the Brazilian leagues. Saulo joined Polish team ŁKS Łódź and made his Ekstraklasa debut against Zagłębie Lubin, playing 74 minutes before being subbed off. His next game, which also proved to be his last for ŁKS was against Górnik Zabrze with Saulo being sent off in the 33rd minute. ŁKS Łódź ended up winning the 1997–98 Ekstraklasa, resulting in Saulo being declared a winner of the competition. Saulo next played for Polonia Gdańsk, before playing for Lechia-Polonia Gdańsk a team created by a merger between Polonia Gdańsk and Lechia Gdańsk. Saulo made his Lechia-Polonia debut against another merger team, Polonia-Szombierki Bytom in a 2–1 win. In total Saulo made 13 appearances for Lechia-Polonia, with 11 of those coming in the league.

Honours

ŁKS Łódź
Ekstraklasa: 1997–98

References

1971 births
ŁKS Łódź players
Polonia Gdańsk players
Lechia Gdańsk players
Brazilian footballers
Association football midfielders
Living people
Place of birth missing (living people)